Yang Du (15 January 1875 – 17 September 1931) was a Chinese politician.

Names

His birth name was Yang Chengzan. His style name was Xizi and his art names was Hugong, Huchan, Huchanshi, Hutoutuo, and Shihu.

Biography
Yang was born into a family of farming background in the village of Shitang, in the town of Jiangyu, Xiangtan in Hunan province. His grandfather, Yang Litang, was a soldier of the Xiang Army. His father, Yang Yisheng, was a farmer. Yang was the elder of three children. His father died of illness when he was 10 years old, Yang was raised by his uncle, Yang Ruisheng.

Yang studied under Wang Kaiyun. His classmates such as: Xia Shoutian, Yang Rui, Liu Guangdi, Liu Kuiyi, and Qi Baishi.

In 1902, Yang went to Japan, studying in Hongwen Academy. In 1904, Yang studied politics in Hosei University.

In 1911, Yang served as the Director of the National Bureau of Statistics. In 1914, Yang became a senator in the senate. When Yuan Shikai died, Yang became a buddhist.

In 1922, Yang joined the Kuomintang in Shanghai. In 1929, Yang joined the Chinese Communist Party.

In September 1931, Yang died of illness in Shanghai.

Personal life

Yang had two sons with Huang Hua and six with Xu Canleng (three sons and three daughters).

With Huang Hua:
 Dr. Yang Gongshu, chemist, he was a graduate student in chemistry at the Berlin University.
 Dr. Yang Gongzhao, geographer, he was a graduate student in geology at the Berlin University.

With Xu Canleng:

 Yang Yunhui, dramatist.
 Yang Yunbi
 Yang Gongsu
 Yang Gongmin
 Yang Yunjie
 Yang Gongwu

References

1875 births
Republic of China politicians from Hunan
Politicians from Xiangtan
Hosei University alumni
1931 deaths
Qing dynasty politicians from Hunan
Chinese monarchists
Chinese expatriates in Japan